Yes Stars Base (styled as Yes Stars Base) is an Israeli television channel carried by the Israeli satellite television provider - Yes, which broadcasts American and British TV shows joint with Hot's channel HOT3 before it was moved to Hot Family. The channel aired on December 14, 2008, on channel 15 - as part of the latest television shows' channels re-brand by Yes. The channel replaced the former Yes Stars 3.

In December 2009, Yes Base moved to channel 16 toward the re-brand of Yes Stars 2010 channels.

On November 4, 2015, yes Base was canceled.

Picture Formats
Yes Stars Base airs shows in four formats:
 Normal (4:3)
 Letterboxed (4:3)
 Pan & Scan (4:3)
 Widescreen (16:9)

In order to watch widescreen (16:9) shows on a 4:3 TV, there are three options for viewing the picture:
 4:3 Letterbox (Widescreen with black bars - Original Aspect Ratio)
 16:9 (Anamorphic Widescreen)
 4:3 (Pan & scan)

Choosing the format of the picture is in the digital set-top box setup. The setup does not affect shows not broadcast in Widescreen.

History of the channel

On March 4, 2007, yes replaced the channel Channel 3 of yes - which was actually Channel 3 and has been cancelled on March 3  - with yes stars 3, as part of the re-brand of the foreign TV shows channels and expanding yes stars to 3 channels - yes stars 1, yes stars 2 and yes stars 3.

On March 14, 2008, as part of a new re-brand of the television shows channels on yes, yes stars 3'' obtained a new logo.

External links

Television channels and stations disestablished in 2015
Television channels in Israel
Yes (Israel)
Defunct television channels in Israel